Uspenskoye is a rural locality (a selo) and the administrative center of Uspensky District in Krasnodar Krai, Russia, located on the Kuban River. Population:

References

Rural localities in Krasnodar Krai